The rust-and-yellow tanager (Thlypopsis ruficeps) is a species of bird in the family Thraupidae.
It is found in Argentina, Bolivia, and Peru.
Its natural habitats are subtropical or tropical moist montane forests and heavily degraded former forest.

References

rust-and-yellow tanager
Birds of the Yungas
rust-and-yellow tanager
Taxonomy articles created by Polbot